This is a list of law schools in Ireland.

Public

 Faculty of Law (University College Cork)
 Faculty of Law (National University of Ireland Galway)
 School of Law (Trinity College, Dublin)
 School of Law (Maynooth University) 
 Sutherland School of Law (University College Dublin)
 School of Law (University of Limerick)
 School of Law and Government (Dublin City University)

In Northern Ireland

 School of Law (Queen's University, Belfast)
 School of Law (Ulster University)

Professional
 Kings Inns
 Law Society of Ireland

IT sector
 Athlone Institute of Technology
 Dublin Institute of Technology
 Sligo Institute of Technology
 Letterkenny Institute of Technology
 Waterford Institute of Technology

Non-public, affiliated to law schools in other jurisdictions
 Griffith College Dublin  
 Griffith College Cork
 Dublin Business School Law School
 Independent College Dublin

U.S. Law Schools running programmes in Ireland
 Fordham University
 University of Notre Dame
 University of Kansas
 Duquesne University
 University of Tulsa
 Quinnipiac University
 New England School of Law Boston
 University of Missouri

References

Universities and colleges in the Republic of Ireland
Law schools in Ireland
Ireland
Law faculties
Schools, law